Dolok Sanggul is a town in North Sumatra province of Indonesia and it is the seat (capital) of Humbang Hasundutan Regency.

Notable peoples
 Ghozali Siregar, is an Indonesian footballer who plays for Persita in the midfield position , he has also played for PSM Makassar and Persib in the Indonesian Super League (now Liga 1 (Indonesia)).

 Friedrich Silaban, is a famous Indonesian architect. His most famous designs, such as the Istiqlal Mosque and the Gelora Bung Karno Main Stadium in Jakarta, were commissioned during Sukarno's presidency

Populated places in North Sumatra
Regency seats of North Sumatra